|}

The Park Stakes is a Group 2 flat horse race in Great Britain open to horses aged three years or older. It is run at Doncaster over a distance of 7 furlongs and 6 yards (1,414 metres), and it is scheduled to take place each year in September.

History
The event was established in 1978 and it used to be sponsored by Kiveton Park Steel. For a period the Kiveton Park Stakes was classed at Listed level and contested over 7 furlongs. It was promoted to Group 3 status in 1986, and extended to a mile in 1993. The word "Kiveton" was removed from its title in 1996.

The race reverted to 7 furlongs in 2003, and it was upgraded to Group 2 in 2004.

The Park Stakes is held during Doncaster's four-day St. Leger Festival. It is currently run on the final day, the same day as the St Leger Stakes.

Records

Most successful horse (2 wins):
 Bishop of Cashel – 1995, 1996
 Iffraaj – 2005, 2006
 Arabian Gleam – 2007, 2008

Leading jockey (5 wins):
 Frankie Dettori - Green Line Express (1990), Handsome Ridge (1998), Iffraaj (2006), Wichita (2020), Kinross (2022)

Leading trainer (4 wins):
 Sir Michael Stoute – The Quiet Bidder (1982), Soviet Line (1994), Tough Speed (2001). Mustashry (2018)

Winners

 The 2006 running took place at York.

See also
 Horse racing in Great Britain
 List of British flat horse races

References
 Paris-Turf: 
 Racing Post:
 galopp-sieger.de – Park Stakes.
 horseracingintfed.com – International Federation of Horseracing Authorities – Park Stakes (2018).
 pedigreequery.com – Park Stakes – Doncaster.
 
 racenewsonline.co.uk – OLBG.com Sponsors Group Two Park Stakes At Doncaster In Three-Year Deal (2012).

Flat races in Great Britain
Doncaster Racecourse
Open mile category horse races
Recurring sporting events established in 1978
1978 establishments in England